KZMU (90.1 FM and 106.7 FM) is a radio station broadcasting a Variety format. Licensed to Moab, Utah, United States, the station is currently owned by Moab Public Radio, Inc.  Founded in 1992, KZMU is an all-volunteer station served by some 75 D.J.s and five part-time staff.

In the spring of 2003, KZMU began operating solely on wind power through Utah Power's Blue Sky Program, in which KZMU purchases blocks of power from wind farms in Oregon and Wyoming. In 2008, KZMU became solar powered through a grant program with Rocky Mountain Power.

See also
Community radio
List of community radio stations in the United States

References

External links

ZMU
Radio stations established in 1992
Wind power in Utah
Community radio stations in the United States